Ellen Molloy (born 5 June 2004) is an Irish footballer who plays as a midfielder for Wexford Youths of the Women's National League (WNL) and the Republic of Ireland women's national team.

Club career
In a decorated career in youth soccer, Molloy enjoyed success with Thomastown United and Presentation Secondary School, Kilkenny. She was already seen as an exceptional prospect when she transferred to reigning WNL champions Wexford Youths in July 2019.

Molloy debuted for Wexford Youths on the first day of the delayed 2020 Women's National League season, scoring two goals and serving one assist in a 4–1 home win over Bohemians. She won the WNL Player of the Month award for August 2020 and was praised by Wexford Youths coach Tom Elmes: "She has hit the ground running. She is versatile and can play in a number of different roles and she's done really well for us."

In September 2020 Molloy scored twice as Wexford inflicted a first defeat of the season on champions Peamount United. She scored another two goals, including a "goal of the season contender" against Galway on 31 October 2020. At the WNL Awards in December 2020, Molloy was named Young Player of the Season and named in the Team of the Season.

Molloy's impressive form continued into the 2021 Women's National League season. She scored four times in a 7–1 win over Treaty United, then hit a "brilliant, long range" goal in a 5–0 win over Galway two weeks later. She was named Player of the Match in the 2021 FAI Women's Cup Final, as Wexford Youths defeated Shelbourne 3–1. She retained her place in the Team of the Season at the 2021 WNL Awards. Having scored 13 goals from midfield she agreed to remain with Wexford Youths for the following season.

In 2022 Molloy had scored 16 goals and was the league's second top goal scorer as Wexford Youths challenged for the title. She suffered an anterior cruciate ligament injury in a September 2022 fixture against Treaty United and missed the run-in.

International career

Youth
Molloy scored an acclaimed goal for the Republic of Ireland women's national under-17 football team against Iceland in February 2020 which went viral on social media and brought her to wider attention. The strike was later voted International Goal of the Year at the FAI International Football Awards, making Molloy the first female winner.  

In September 2021 Molloy debuted for the Republic of Ireland women's national under-19 football team, scoring in her team's 2–1 friendly defeat by Norway in Portugal. She made five appearances throughout the year, scoring three goals.

Senior
Senior Republic of Ireland national team coach Vera Pauw called up Molloy for the first time on 28 August 2020, for the UEFA Women's Euro 2022 qualifier against Germany on 19 September 2020. Molloy made her senior international debut in Ireland's next match, against Ukraine in Kyiv on 23 October 2020. She was an 86th-minute substitute for Harriet Scott in Ireland's 1–0 defeat.

After allowing Molloy to gain experience with the under-19s, Pauw recalled her to the seniors in November 2021, for 2023 FIFA Women's World Cup qualification – UEFA Group A fixtures against Slovakia and Georgia. However a hamstring injury sustained in the 2021 FAI Women's Cup Final forced Molloy to drop out of the squad.

Molloy was called up again in February 2022, for the 2022 Pinatar Cup in Murcia. She sat her Leaving Cert mock exams early in order to take part. Molloy made her first start for Ireland on the occasion of her fifth cap, on 19 February 2022 in the 1–0 defeat by Russia.

References

External links
 
 

2004 births
Living people
Republic of Ireland women's association footballers
Women's association football midfielders
Wexford Youths W.F.C. players
Women's National League (Ireland) players
Association footballers from County Kilkenny
Republic of Ireland women's international footballers
Republic of Ireland women's youth international footballers